The following is a list of banks in the Arab World. The modern system of Arab banks was created in Egypt in the late 19th century, with the campaign of modernizing the country. Today Arab banks are among the most pioneering in Developing countries, and some are competitors to major international banks. A new system of banking has also been introduced by the Arab World, to suit its Islamic laws regarding the creation of wealth, thus Islamic banks were created.

Algeria

Central bank
 Bank of Algeria

Commercial Public Banks
 Banque Nationale d'Algérie (BNA).
 Banque Extérieure d'Algérie (BEA).
 Banque de l'Agriculture et du Développement Rural (BADR).
 Banque de Développement Local (BDL).
 Crédit Populaire d'Algérie (CPA).
 Caisse Nationale d'Épargne et de Prévoyance (CNEP).
 Caisse Nationale de Mutualité Agricole (CNMA) .

Commercial Private Banks
 Citibank Algéria
 Banque AlBaraka Algérie
 Arab Banking Corporation "ABC" Algérie
 Natixis Banque Algérie
 Société Générale Algérie
 BNP Paribas El DJAZAÏR
 Arab Bank Algeria
 Trust Bank Algéria
 Gulf Bank Algeria
 Housing Bank For Trade And Finance Algeria
 Fransabank El DJAZAÏR
 Calyon Algérie
 Al Salam Bank Algeria
 HSBC Algeria

Bahrain

Central bank
Central Bank of Bahrain

Retail Conventional Banks

Ahli United Bank B.S.C.
Arab Bank PLC
Bahrain Development Bank B.S.C. BBK
BMI Bank B.S.C (c)
BNP Paribas
Citibank Bahrain 
Credit Libanais SAL
Eskan Bank
Future Bank B.S.C. (c)
Habib Bank Limited
HSBC Bank Middle East Limited
ICICI Bank Limited
MashreqBank psc
National Bank of Abu Dhabi (Bahrain Branch) National Bank of Bahrain BSC
National Bank of Kuwait S.A.K. Rafidain Bank
Standard Chartered Bank
State Bank of India
The Housing Bank for Trade and Finance - Jordan United Bank Limited

Wholesale Conventional Banks

Addax Bank B.S.C (c)
Allied Bank Limited
Alubaf Arab International Bank (Bahrain) B.S.C. (c)
Arab Bank plc
Arab Banking Corporation (B.S.C.)
Arab Investment Company S.A.A.(The)
Arab Petroleum Investments Corporation APICORP
Askari Bank Limited
Awal Bank B.S.C. (c)
Bahrain Arab International Bank (BAIB) Under liquidation
Bahrain International Bank E.C. Under liquidation
Bahrain Middle East Bank B.S.C.
Bank Alfalah Limited
Bank Al Habib Limited
Bank of Baroda
BNP Paribas
BNP Paribas 3U
Cairo Amman Bank
Canara Bank
Capital Union E.C. ( c ) Under liquidation
Citibank Bahrain
Citicorp Banking Corporation
Denizbank A.S.
Finansbank A.S.
Gulf International Bank B.S.C.
Gulf Investment Corporation
Gulf One Investment Bank B.S.C ( c )
Habib Bank Limited
HDFC Bank
HSBC Bank Middle East Limited
ING Bank A.S.
International Bank for Commerce Under liquidation
Investcorp Bank B.S.C.
JPMorgan Chase Bank, N.A.
JS Bank Limited
Korea Exchange Bank
Kuwait Asia Bank E.C. Under liquidation
Malayan Banking Berhad Maybank
MCB Bank Limited
National Bank of Abu Dhabi
National Bank of Pakistan
Philippine National Bank
Saudi National Commercial Bank (The)
Securities & Investment Company B.S.C ( c )
Standard Chartered Bank
State Bank of India
TAIB Bank B.S.C. (c)
The Bank of Tokyo-Mitsubishi UFJ Ltd.
The International Banking Corporation B.S.C. (c)
Turk Ekonomi Bankasi Under liquidation
Turkiye Halk Bankasi A.S
Turkiye Is Bankasi A.S.
UBS Global Asset Management (UK) Ltd.
United Gulf Bank (B.S.C) E.C.
Vakifbank Turkiye Vakiflar Bankasi
Woori Bank
Yapi ve Kredi Bankasi A.S.

Retail Islamic Banks

Al Baraka Islamic Bank B.S.C. ( c ) 
Al-Salam Bank -Bahrain B.S.C. 
Bahrain Islamic Bank B.S.C. 
Ithmaar Bank B.S.C.
Khaleeji Commercial Bank B.S.C.
Kuwait Finance House (Bahrain) B.S.C. (c)

Wholesale Islamic Banks
ABC Islamic Bank (E.C.)
Al Baraka Banking Group B.S.C. (c) 
Arab Islamic Bank (E.C)
Bank Al-Khair B.S.C. ( c )
Citi Islamic Investment Bank E.C.
First Energy Bank B.S.C. ( c )
GFH Investment Bank (B.S.C) E.C.
Global Banking Corporation BSC ( c ) 
Ibdar Bank B.S.C.
International Investment Bank B.S.C (c) 
Investment Dar Bank B.S.C ( c ) 
Investors Bank B.S.C. (c)
Kuwait Turkish Participation Bank Inc. 
Liquidity Management Centre B.S.C (c) 
RA Bahrain B.S.C. ( c )
Seera Investment Bank B.S.C ( c ) 
Turkiye Finans Katilim Banakasi A.S. 
Venture Capital Bank B.S.C (c)

List of Banks & Financial Institutions as of 30 June 2015

Comoros

Central bank
Central Bank of the Comoros (Banque Centrale des Comores)

Development banks
Banque de Développement des Comores

Commercial banks
Banque pour l'Industrie et le Commerce des Comores
Exim Bank Comores Ltd
Société Nationale des Postes et des Services Financiers

Networks of mutual savings
Mutuelles d'épargne et crédit des Comores
Sanduk

Sources:
 https://web.archive.org/web/20120220134155/http://www.portalino.it/banks/_km.htm
 https://web.archive.org/web/20081218091525/http://www.afdb.org/pls/portal/docs/PAGE/ADB_ADMIN_PG/DOCUMENTS/FINANCIALINFORMATION/COMOROS.PDF
 https://web.archive.org/web/20120312060035/http://www.thecitizen.co.tz/newe.php?id=6437

Djibouti

Central bank
National Bank of Djibouti or (Banque Nationale de Djibouti)

Commercial banks
Banque Al Baraka Djibouti
Banque de Djibouti et du Moyen Orient SA
Banque Indosuez Mer Rouge
Banque pour le Commerce et l'Industrie - Mer Rouge
British Bank of Middle-East
Banque de dépôt de l'Ethiopie
Banque d'Epargne de la Somalie
Caisse de Développement
International Commercial Bank
Salam African Bank

Sources:
 https://web.archive.org/web/20120220134203/http://www.portalino.it/banks/_dj.htm
 https://web.archive.org/web/20100108124401/http://www.muslimtrade.net/tradeguideline/djibouti/
 http://allafrica.com/stories/200812290109.html

Egypt

Central bank
Central Bank of Egypt (Al-Bank al-Markazī al-Masrī)

Banks
Al Ahram Bank
Al Mohandes Bank
Al Watani Bank of Egypt
Alexandria Bank
Union National Bank-Egypt
Alexandria Kuwait International Bank
Arab African International Bank
Arab Bank
Arab Banking Corporation
Arab International Bank
Arab Investment Bank
Banca Romana de Comert Exterior
Banco do Brasil
Bank Melli Iran
Bank of Alexandria
Bank of America NT & SA
Bank of Commerce & Development
Bank of Credit & Commerce
Bank of Egypt
Bank of Tokyo
Bank Saderat Iran
Bank Sohar SAOG
Bankers Trust Company
Banque de l'Union Européene
Banque du Caire
Banque du Caire et de Paris
Banque Indosuez
Banque Misr
Banque Nationale de Paris
Banque Paribas
Barclays Bank
Byblos Arab Finance Bank
Cairo Amman Bank
Audi SAE-Egypt
Chase Manhattan Overseas Corporation
Chase National Bank of Egypt SAE
Citibank
Commercial International Bank
Crédit Commercial de France

Credit Foncier Egyptien
Credit International d'Egypt
Crédit Lyonnais
Credit Suisse
Credito Italiano
Dakahlia Commercial Bank
Delta International Bank
Deutsche Bank AG
Development Industrial Bank
Development International Bank
Dresdner Bank AG
Egypt Arab African Bank
Egyptian American Bank
Egyptian Arab Land Bank
Egyptian British Bank SAE
Egyptian Gulf Bank
Egyptian Saudi Finance Bank
Egyptian Workers Bank
European Arab Bank
Export Development Bank of Egypt
Faisal Islamic Bank of Egypt
Gharbia National Bank for Development
Giza National Bank for Development
Habib Bank Ltd
Housing and Development Bank
Industrial Development Bank
Islamic Banking System International
Islamic International Bank for Investment & Development
Jammal Trust Bank
Lloyds Bank International Ltd
Mashreq Bank
Middle East Bank
MISR America International Bank
MISR Exterior Bank
MISR Iran Development Bank
MISR Romanian Bank
Mohandes Bank
Monte dei Paschi Banking Group
Morgan Grenfell & Co Ltd
Nasser Social Bank
National Bank for Development
National Bank of Abu Dhabi
National Bank of Egypt
National Bank of Greece
National Bank of Oman
National Bank of Pakistan
National Bank of Sudan
National Egyptian Bank
National Investment Bank
National Société Générale Bank SAE
Nova Ljubljanska Banka
Overseas Development & Investment
Port Said National Bank for Development
Principal Bank for Development & Agricultural Credit
Pyramids Bank
Qaliubia National Bank for Development
Rafidain Bank
Royal Bank of Canada
Société Arabe Internationale de Banque
Société Générale Egypte Banque Française
State Bank of India
Suez Canal Bank
Sumitomo Bank
Swiss Bank Corporation
Trans Arabian Investment Bank
The Bank Of Nova Scotia
The Nile Bank
United Bank of Egypt
Union National Bank
Banca Commerciale Italiana
Commerzbank

Source: https://web.archive.org/web/20130126183205/http://www.portalino.it/banks/_eg.htm

Iraq

Central bank
Central Bank of Iraq

State-owned banks
Rafidain Bank
Rasheed Bank
Industrial Bank 
Agricultural Cooperative Bank of Iraq 
Real Estate Bank of Iraq 
Bank of Iraq 
Trade Bank of Iraq

Private banks
Al Qurtas Islamic Bank for Investment and Finance (QIB)
International Development Bank of Iraq (IDB)
Ashur International Bank for Investment
FIRST IRAQI BANK
Albaraka Bank Turkey
Kurdistan International Bank
Ghana Bank
Babylon Bank
Bank of Baghdad
Basrah International Bank for Investment
Commercial Bank of Iraq
Credit Bank of Iraq
Dar Es Salaam Investment Bank
Dijlah & Furat Bank
Economy Bank Iraq
Gulf Commercial Bank
Taawen Islamic Bank
Industrial Union Investment Bank
Investment Bank of Iraq
Iraqi Middle East Investment Bank
Islamic Bank
Mosul Bank
National Bank of Iraq
North Bank
Sumer Bank
Union Bank of Iraq
Bank Audi
ِWorld Islamic Bank
ِElaf Islamic Bank
United Investment Bank
Al Janoob Islamic Bank
 T.C. Ziraat Bankasi of Turkey (the Turkish state agricultural bank)
 Bank Mili Iran (the national bank of Iran)
Byblos Bank (Lebanese)

International banks
Standard Chartered Bank

Jordan
Arab Banking Corporation
Arab Bank
Al Rajhi Bank
Audi Bank
Bank of Jordan
Blom Bank
Cairo Amman Bank
Capital Bank of Jordan
Central Bank of Jordan
Citibank
Egyptian Arab Land Bank
HSBC
Islamic International Arab Bank
Investbank
Jordan Ahli Bank
Jordan Commercial Bank
Jordan Dubai Islamic Bank
Jordan Islamic Bank
Jordan Kuwait Bank
National Bank of Kuwait
National Bank of Abu Dhabi
Rafidain Bank
Société Générale
Standard Chartered
The Housing Bank for Trade and Finance
Jordan Islamic Bank
Union Bank

Kuwait

Central Bank
 Central Bank of Kuwait
 Kuwait Credit Bank

Local Banks
 National Bank of Kuwait
 Gulf Bank of Kuwait
 Commercial Bank of Kuwait
 Al Ahli Bank of Kuwait
 Ahli United Bank Kuwait 
 Kuwait International Bank
 Burgan Bank
 Kuwait Finance House
 Boubyan Bank
 Warba Bank
 The Industrial Bank of Kuwait

Foreign Banks
 Bank of Bahrain and Kuwait
 HSBC Bank Middle East 
 BNP Paribas 
 Citibank N.A. Kuwait 
 Mashreq Bank
 First Abu Dhabi Bank
 Doha Bank
 Qatar National Bank
 Al-Rajhi Bank
 Bank Muscat
 Industrial and Commercial Bank of China

Lebanon

Central bank
 Banque du Liban

Major banks
 Bank of Beirut S.A.L.
 BankMed S.A.L.
 Banque Libano-Française S.A.L. (BLF)
 BLOM Bank S.A.L.
 Byblos Bank S.A.L.
 Crédit Libanais S.A.L.
 Federal Bank of Lebanon S.A.L.
 Fransabank S.A.L.
 Citibank, N.A.
 Audi Saradar Bank S.A.L
 IBL BANK S.A.L

Other banks
 B.L.C. Bank S.A.L.
 Al-Mawarid Bank S.A.L.
 Arab Investment Bank S.A.L.
 Bank Al Madina S.A.L.
 Banque BEMO S.A.L.
 Banque de la Bekaa S.A.L.
 Banque de l'Habitat S.A.L.
 Banque de l'Industrie Et Du Travail S.A.L.
 Banque Lati S.A.L.
 Banque Misr Liban S.A.L.
 BBAC S.A.L.
 Creditbank S.A.L.
 FFA Private Bank
 Finance Bank S.A.L.
 First National Bank S.A.L.
 MEAB S.A.L.
 Méditerranée Investment Bank S.A.L.
 Near East Commercial Bank S.A.L.
 Société Générale de Banque au Liban S.A.L.

Foreign banks
 Arab Finance House S.A.L.
 Banca Di Roma S.P.A
 Bank of Kuwait And The Arab World S.A.L.
 Banque Nationale de Paris "Intercontinentale"
 HSBC Bank Middle East Limited
 Intercontinental Bank of Lebanon S.A.L.
 Standard Chartered Bank S.A.L.
 Lebanese Canadian Bank S.A.L.
 Lebanese Islamic Bank S.A.L.
 Lebanese Swiss Bank S.A.L.
 Lebanon & Gulf Bank S.A.L.
 Société Nouvelle de la Banque de Syrie et du Liban S.A.L.
 Syrian Lebanese Commercial Bank S.A.L.
 National Bank of Kuwait (Lebanon) S.A.L.

Libya

Central bank
Central Bank of Libya

Banks
Alsaraya Trading And Development Bank
Aman Bank for Commerce & Development
Al-Wafa Bank
Alejmaa Alarabi Bank
Banque Sahélo-Saharienne pour l'Investissement et le Commerce
Jamahiriya Bank
Libyan Arab Foreign Bank
Libyan Development Bank
Mediterranean Bank
National Agricultural Bank of Libya
National Banking Corporation
National Commercial Bank
Sahara Bank
Savings and Real Estate Bank of Libya
Tripoli Agricultural Bank
Umma Bank
Wahda Bank

Sources:
 https://web.archive.org/web/20130818143800/http://www.portalino.it/banks/_ly.htm
 List of Libyan Banks
 http://www.cbl.gov.ly/en/variant/index.php?cid=102

Mauritania

Central bank
Central Bank of Mauritania  or (Banque Centrale de Mauritanie)

Banks
Banque Arabe Africaine en Mauritanie
Banque Arabe Liyenne Mauritaienne pour le Commerce Extérieur
Banque Internationale pour la Mauritanie
Banque Maurienienne Nationale
Banque Mauritanienne pour le Commerce International
Banque Mauritanienne pour le Développement et le Commerce
Banque Mondiale en Mauritanie
Caisse Centrale de Coopération Économique
Chinguitty Bank
Generale de Banque de Mauritanie pour l'Investissement et le Commerce
Union de Banques de Development

Source: https://web.archive.org/web/20130818113312/http://www.portalino.it/banks/_mr.htm

Morocco

Central bank
Bank Al-Maghrib

Major banks
Attijariwafa Bank (born by the fusion of Banque Commerciale du Maroc and Wafabank)
Banque Marocaine du Commerce Extérieur (BMCE Bank)
Crédit Agricole du Maroc
Groupe Banque Populaire
Crédit Immobilier et Hôtelier (CIH Bank)
Banque Marocaine pour le Commerce et l'Industrie (BMCI)
Société Générale Maroc
Crédit du Maroc
Al-Barid Bank

Investment banks
Casablanca Finance Group
Attijari Finances Corp.
BMCE Capital
CDG Capital
Capital Trust Maroc

Other banks
ABN AMRO Maroc
Arab Bank Maroc
Banco Immobiliario y Mercantil de Marruecos
Bank Al Amal
Banque Marocaine pour l'Afrique et l'Orient
Banque Nationale pour le Développement Économique
Bex-Maroc
Citibank
Commerzbank
Crédit Populaire du Maroc
Limar Bank Casa Union Marocaine de Banques
Raw-Mat Bank
Société de Banque & de Crédit
Société Marocaine de Depôt et de Crédit
Société Mithaq Al Maghrib
Union Bancaria Hispano Marroqui Uniban
Union Marocaine des Banques

Qatar
Qatar Central Bank
The Commercial Bank of Qatar
Arab Bank
Qatar National Bank 
Habib Bank Ltd
Standard Chartered Bank
International Bank of Qatar
Masraf Al Rayan
Qatar Islamic Bank
Qatar International Islamic Bank
HSBC
Bank Saderat Iran
United Bank Limited
Qatar Development Bank
al khaliji Commercial Bank
Doha Bank
Mashreq Bank
Ahli Bank
BNP Paribas
Barwa Bank
State Bank of India
Charanjeet bank

Syria

Central bank
Central Bank of Syria

Public banks
Commercial Bank of Syria
Industrial Bank of Syria
Agricultural Cooperative Bank
Popular Credit Bank
Real-Estate Bank
Saving Bank

Private banks
Syria Gulf Bank
Banque BEMO Saudi Fransi
Bank of Syria and Overseas
The International Bank for Trade & Finance
Bank Audi
Arab Bank
Byblos Bank
Qatar National Bank

Islamic banks
Syria International Islamic Bank
Cham Bank
Baraka Bank

Somalia

Central bank
Central Bank of Somalia

Development bank
Somali Development Bank

Commercial banks
National Bank of Somalia
Commercial and Savings Bank of Somalia
Somali Commercial Bank
Al Barakaat Bank, Mogadishu
Dalsan Bank
Universal Bank of Somalia (UBSOM)

Sources:
 https://web.archive.org/web/20110728040758/http://somalbanca.org/home.html
 Central Bank of Somalia
 http://www.nbos.org/
 https://web.archive.org/web/20130818115746/http://www.portalino.it/banks/_so.htm

Sudan

Central bank
Central Bank of Sudan
Source: http://www.cbos.gov.sd

Commercial banks
Agricultural Bank of Sudan
Al-Baraka Bank
Al Shimal Islamic Bank
Animal Resources Bank
Arab Bank for Economic Development in Africa
Arab Sudanese Bank 
Bank of Khartoum
Bank of Oman
Banque Sahélo-Saharienne pour l'Investissement et le Commerce
Blue Nile Bank
Chase Manhattan Bank
Citibank
El Nilein Bank
Expetriate Bank
Faisal Islamic Bank
Financial Investment Bank
Habib Bank
Industrial Bank of Sudan
International Bank for Reconstruction and Development
Ivory Bank
Islamic Bank for Western Sudan
Islamic Co-operative Development Bank
Khartoum Bank
Mashreq Bank
Middle East Bank
National Bank of Abu Dhabi
National Bank of Sudan
National Development Bank
National Export/Import Bank
Nilein Bank
People Co-operative Bank
Saudian Sudanese Bank
Sudan Agricultural Bank
Sudan Commercial Bank
Sudanese Baraka Bank
Sudanese Estates Bank
Sudanese French Bank
Sudanese International Bank
Sudanese Islamic Bank
Sudanese National Bank
Sudanese Saudian Bank
Sudanese Savings Bank
Tadamon Islamic Bank
Unity Bank
Union Trust Bank

Source: https://web.archive.org/web/20130818113227/http://www.portalino.it/banks/_sd.htm

Tunisia

Central bank
Central Bank of Tunisia (Banque Centrale de Tunisie) ( http://www.bct.gov.tn )

Banks
Alubaf International Bank
Amen Bank
Arab Banking Corporation
Arab Tunisian Bank
Bankers Trust Company
Banque Arabe Tuniso Libyenne de Développement et le Commerce Extérieur
Banque de Coopération du Maghreb Arabe
Banque de Développement Économique de Tunisie
Banque de l'Habitat
Banque de Tunisie
Banque de Tunisie et des Emirats d'Investissement
Banque du Sud
Banque Franco Tunisienne
Banque Internationale Arabe de Tunisie
Banque Nationale Agricole
Banque Nationale de Développement Touristique
Banque Nationale de Tunisie
Banque Tuniso Qatarie d'Investissement
Banque Tuniso-Koweitienne de Développement
Beit Ettamwil Tounsi Saudi
Citibank
Credit Foncier et Commercial de Tunisie
North Africa International Bank
Societe Tunisienne de Banque
Tunis International Bank
Union Bancaire pour le Commerce et l'Industrie
Union Internationale de Banque
Union Tunisienne de Banques

Source: https://web.archive.org/web/20130818112145/http://www.portalino.it/banks/_tn.htm

United Arab Emirates

Central Bank
 Central Bank of the United Arab Emirates

Major commercial banks
Abu Dhabi Commercial Bank
National Bank of Abu Dhabi
Emirates NBD
Abu Dhabi Investment Authority
MashreqBank
American Express Bank Limited
Bank of America
Bank of China
Bank of India
Citibank United Arab Emirates
Indian Bank
JPMorgan Chase
ABN AMRO
Scotiabank
Credit Suisse
Deutsche Bank
Fortis Bank
National Bank of Kuwait
Royal Bank of Scotland
Arab Bank
Bank of New York
Hang Seng Bank
ICICI Bank
Royal Bank of Canada
State Bank of India
Toronto Dominion Bank
Central Bank of India
Axis Bank
Bank Melli Iran
Bank Saderat Iran
Gulf Commercial Bank
Bank of Jordan
Allied Bank
Standard Chartered
Bank of Baroda
HSBC Bank Middle East
First Gulf Bank
Habib Bank
United Bank
RAKBANK
Commercial Bank of Dubai
Invest Bank
Gulf Merchant Bank
Commercial Bank International
Union National Bank

Islamic banks
Al Hilal Bank
Dubai Islamic Bank
Emirates Islamic Bank
Sharjah Islamic Bank
Abu Dhabi Islamic Bank
Islamic Commercial Bank
Noor Islamic Bank

Defunct or merged banks
Bank of Credit and Commerce International

Yemen
 National Bank of Yemen
 SABAA ISLAMIC BANK  
 Shamil Bank of Yemen and Bahrain

References

Arab World
Arab world
Economy of the Arab League